Karl [Carl] von Fischer (19 September 1782 – 12 February 1820) was a German architect. His plans had considerable influence on the architecture of neo-classicism in Munich and South Germany.

Biography 
Fischer was born in Mannheim. From 1796 Fischer was trained by Maximilian von Verschaffelt before he moved to Vienna in 1799 to study architecture under Ferdinand von Hohenberg. 

An early design, at the age of only 22, the Prinz-Carl-Palais in Munich (completed 1803), made him famous and he became a professor of architecture at the Academy of Fine Arts, Munich in 1809. In 1811–18 Fischer constructed the National Theatre, destroyed in an 1823 fire. He also created the plan for the extension of Munich, especially for the Brienner Strasse with the circular Karolinenplatz and the Königsplatz, the last of which was built to Klenze's plan.

Fischer, who was a representative of pure classicism and who rejected romantic historism, was soon displaced by Leo von Klenze as chief architect for the Bavarian court. He died in Munich aged 38, and is buried in the Alter Südfriedhof.

His notable pupils include Friedrich von Gärtner.

See also 
 Neoclassical architecture
 Greek revival

References

18th-century German architects
German artists
German neoclassical architects
Architects of the Bavarian court
1782 births
1820 deaths
Academic staff of the Academy of Fine Arts, Munich
Burials at the Alter Südfriedhof
19th-century German architects